Helgåa is a river in the municipality of Verdal in Trøndelag county, Norway. At Granfossen there is a fish ladder.

See also
List of rivers in Norway

References

Rivers of Trøndelag
Verdal
Rivers of Norway